Sharh (plural shuruh) is an Arabic term used in book titles, it literally means "explanation" or "expounding of" usually used in commentaries on non-Qur'anic works. 

It may refer specifically to: 

Sharh Nahj al-Balgha (disambiguation)
Fathul Bari fi Sharh Sahih al Bukhari